Enella Benedict (December 21, 1858 – April 6, 1942) was an American realism and landscape painter. She taught at the School of the Art Institute of Chicago and was a founder and director for nearly 50 years for the Art School at the Hull House.

Early life and education
Enella Benedict was born in Lake Forest, Illinois, the daughter of cloth merchant Amzi and Catherine Walmath Benedict. Amzi Benedict was with the Field, Benedict & Company firm and was a city council member and mayor of Lake Forest. Her younger siblings included Caroline, Albert, Sydney and Kate.

Benedict attended Lake Forest University, where she studied painting and drawing and was a junior in 1876.

She studied art at the School of the Art Institute of Chicago and the Art Students League of New York. She then traveled to Paris, France to study at the Académie Julian. Despite being at a prestigious academy, as a female student, she received less rigorous training and was charged more for tuition compared to male students. As a woman, she was often isolated from other students.

Career
Benedict made oil and watercolor portrait, figure, landscapes and urban scene paintings. Benedict's drawing and painting style was influenced by Realism and Impressionism in which she painted and drew individuals she encountered around her, such as residents of Hull House and local peasants, along with seascapes and rural landscapes.

In 1892, she became the founder and director of the Art School at Hull House.

In the 19th century a women's movement began to promote education, autonomy, and break into traditionally male dominated occupations. Organizations led by women, bonded by sisterhood, were formed for social reform, including settlement houses in working class and poor neighborhoods, like Hull House. To develop "new roles for women, the first generation of New Women wove the traditional ways of their mothers into the heart of their brave new world. The social activists, often single, were led by educated, often single New Women.

Benedict lived at Hull House, as did Jane Addams, and supported the Art School program for almost 50 years, teaching clay modeling, drawing, painting and lithography. She managed the artist-in-residence program and other teachers. The art program, led by social reformer Benedict, was intended to offer education and cultural opportunities to disadvantaged neighborhood residents, having promoting some labor professions as art forms, such as textile fields. Benedict created opportunities for artists to exhibit their works, including the Art Institute of Chicago. Reported in Pots of Promise: Mexicans and Pottery at Hull-House, 1920-40: "In proportion to enrollment, there probably have been more exhibiting artists who started in its classes than in most other schools in the country."

While at Hull House, she also taught at the School of The Art Institute of Chicago, Benedict published a column entitled Ms. Benedict Knows about stories about Hull House. where she worked in the mornings which provided income so that she could work afternoons at Hull House without taking payment. She often traveled to Europe during the summers.

Benedict exhibited her work at the Palace of Fine Arts, the Illinois Building, and The Woman's Building at the 1893 World's Columbian Exposition in Chicago, Illinois. Her work was exhibited at the Art Institute of Chicago given by the Art Students League of Chicago and other exhibitions. An art gallery at Hull House was dedicated in her name to promote the work of its artists In 1938 an retrospective was held of her work was held at Benedict Gallery.

She was a member of the Palette Club in Chicago. Her works are in the collections at Hull House, Rockford Art Museum in Illinois, National Museum of Women in the Arts and the Smithsonian Institution.

Death
Benedict died on April 6, 1942 in Richmond Virginia.

Works
 A Foot Path, watercolor, exhibited in 1895 of the Art Students League at the Art Institute of Chicago.<ref name="ASL of 1895">[http://www.artic.edu/sites/default/files/libraries/pubs/1895/AIC1895ArStLeague6thAn_comb.pdf Art Student League of New York Exhibition in 1895] at the Art Institute of Chicago. Retrieved March 11, 2014.</ref>
 Brittany Children, exhibited in 1893 Columbian World's Exposition, National Museum of Women in the Arts
 Counting the Ships, exhibited in 1893 Columbian World's Exposition
 Daily Bread, exhibited in 1893 Columbian World's Exposition
 Evening in the Village, exhibited 1901 Pennsylvania Academy of the Fine Arts
 Greek Easter Procession on Halstead Street (Chicago, Illinois), pastel, 1907, Annual American Exhibition, Art Institute of Chicago
 Landscape Old Stories, exhibited in 1893 Columbian World's Exposition
 Salt Marsh and Cedars, watercolor, exhibited in 1895 of the Art Students League at the Art Institute of Chicago.
 The many, pastel, 1907, Annual American Exhibition, Art Institute of Chicago
 Young Boy at Work William Tomlinson Plant''

References

External links
 

1858 births
1942 deaths
People from Lake Forest, Illinois
20th-century American painters
19th-century American painters
American women painters
School of the Art Institute of Chicago alumni
Académie Julian alumni
20th-century American women artists
19th-century American women artists